The compound of five tetrahedra is one of the five regular polyhedral compounds. This compound polyhedron is also a stellation of the regular icosahedron. It was first described by Edmund Hess in 1876.

It can be seen as a faceting of a regular dodecahedron.

As a compound
It can be constructed by arranging five tetrahedra in rotational icosahedral symmetry (I), as colored in the upper right model. It is one of five regular compounds which can be constructed from identical Platonic solids.

It shares the same vertex arrangement as a regular dodecahedron.

There are two enantiomorphous forms (the same figure but having opposite chirality) of this compound polyhedron. Both forms together create the reflection symmetric compound of ten tetrahedra.

It has a density of higher than 1.

As a stellation

It can also be obtained by stellating the icosahedron, and is given as Wenninger model index 24.

As a faceting

It is a faceting of a dodecahedron, as shown at left.

Group theory 
The compound of five tetrahedra is a geometric illustration of the notion of orbits and stabilizers, as follows.

The symmetry group of the compound is the (rotational) icosahedral group I of order 60, while the stabilizer of a single chosen tetrahedron is the (rotational) tetrahedral group T of order 12, and the orbit space I/T (of order 60/12 = 5) is naturally identified with the 5 tetrahedra – the coset gT corresponds to which tetrahedron g sends the chosen tetrahedron to.

An unusual dual property

This compound is unusual, in that the dual figure is the enantiomorph of the original. If the faces are twisted to the right, then the vertices are twisted to the left. When we dualise, the faces dualise to right-twisted vertices and the vertices dualise to left-twisted faces, giving the chiral twin. Figures with this property are extremely rare.

See also 
 Compound of ten tetrahedra
 Compound of five cubes

References

 
 H.S.M. Coxeter, Regular Polytopes, (3rd edition, 1973), Dover edition, 3.6 The five regular compounds, pp.47-50, 6.2 Stellating the Platonic solids, pp.96-104
 (1st Edn University of Toronto (1938))

External links 
 
 Metal Sculpture of Five Tetrahedra Compound
 VRML model: 
 Compounds of 5 and 10 Tetrahedra by Sándor Kabai, The Wolfram Demonstrations Project.
 

Polyhedral stellation
Polyhedral compounds
Chiral polyhedra